Rumley may refer to:

People:
Dennis Rumley, Australian academic
Johnny Rumley, former NASCAR driver 1944

Places:
Rumley, Arkansas, unincorporated community in Van Buren County, Arkansas, United States
Rumley, Ohio, in Shelby County
Rumley Township, Harrison County, Ohio, one of the fifteen townships of Harrison County, Ohio, United States
New Rumley, Ohio, unincorporated community in central Rumley Township, Harrison County, Ohio, United States
Rumley, Texas, unincorporated community in Lampasas County